Count On My Love is the second studio album, and the major-label debut, of Tessanne Chin, released on July 1, 2014. 

"Count On My Love" may also refer to:
"Count On My Love", song by Liz Phair from Somebody's Miracle used in No Reservations (film)
"Count On My Love", by Kai (band) from Kai (Kai album) composed by Tristan Bishop

See also
"Count On Me (Jefferson Starship song)" Top-10 single Earth (Jefferson Starship album) with the line "you can count on my love"